This Is Not My Life is a New Zealand television mystery-thriller which originally aired from 29 July to 14 October 2010 on Television New Zealand's TV One.

Plot 
Set in the 2020s, the show centres on Alec Ross (Charles Mesure) who awakes one morning to find that he doesn't know who or where he is and doesn't recognise his wife or children. The story is set in the fictional town of Waimoana.

Production 
The series is written by Rachel Lang and Gavin Strawhan and directed by Rob Sarkies and Peter Salmon. Thirteen episodes have been produced.

Though the show only lasted one season, it was announced in 2011 that American network ABC had purchased the series to adapt for an American audience.

Cast and characters

Main 
 Charles Mesure as Alec Ross, Alec wakes one morning to find himself in a life he doesn't believe is his. He sets out on a mission to find the truth of where he comes from and what the real truth is behind Waimoana.
 Tandi Wright as Callie Ross, Callie is Alec's wife and mother to his two children. Her greatest desire is to have the perfect family and will do almost anything it takes to keep it.
 Miriama McDowell as Jessica Wilmott, Jessica works as a cleaner at Waimoana Water. She befriends Alec and becomes his ally in digging the secrets from Waimoana.
 Tania Nolan as Dr Natasha Collins, Natasha is Alec's family's doctor at Waimoana's Wellness Clinic. She has some limited knowledge of the goings-on in Waimoana.
 Steven A Davis as Gordy Leach, Gordy works for the surveillance company who makes sure everything in Waimoana stays safe. He has a deep-set desire to be a knight in shining armour.

Recurring 
 John Bach as Harry Sheridan, A Waimoana executive who Alec has vague memories of from before his current life. Alec believes that he has something crucial to do with the mystery.
 Joel Tobeck as Richard Foster, He runs the Waimoana surveillance team and it is his job to make sure nothing is out of place. It is no surprise then that Alec Ross very quickly catches his attention.
 Peter Muller as Stephen Lovritch, Alec's boss at Waimoana Water.
 Katherine Kennard as Hope Lovritch, Stephen's wife. In the past she has had an affair with Alec.
 Alison Bruce as Jude, Alec's PA at Waimoana Water. She finds herself often holding the fort whenever he steps out for golf or on his own errands.
 Ariana Brunet as Becky Ross, Alec's young daughter, she is often plagued with nightmares of a green door and a 'bad man' called Harry.
 Tom Cameron as Christian Ross, Alec's teenage son and who having a secret relationship with Paige.
 Alexandra Foster as Paige Lovritch, Stephen and Hope's teenage daughter, Paige's sexual relationship with Christian causes a lot of tension between Callie and Hope when it is discovered.

Guest 
 Matthew Sunderland as The Cleaner
 Simon Prast as Mike

Episodes

Home media 
The series was released on DVD on 29 June 2011.

References

External links 

2010 New Zealand television series debuts
2010 New Zealand television series endings
Mystery television series
New Zealand science fiction television series
Television shows filmed in New Zealand
Television shows funded by NZ on Air
Television shows set in New Zealand
TVNZ 1 original programming